The Lyulka TR-1 was a turbojet designed by Arkhip Lyulka and produced by his Lyulka design bureau. It was the first indigenous Soviet jet engine.

Development
He demonstrated an eight-stage axial-flow engine in March 1945 called the S-18. The TR-1 was developed in early 1946 and had its first static run on 9 August. It was tested in the air on a pylon fitted to a Lend-Lease B-25 Mitchell piston-engined bomber.

The TR-1 was not a success, proving to have less thrust and a higher specific fuel consumption than designed. Its failure led directly to the cancellation of the first Soviet jet bomber, the Ilyushin Il-22.

Applications
 Alekseyev I-21
 Ilyushin Il-22
 Mikoyan-Gurevich MiG-9  I-305 (izdeliye FT)
 Sukhoi Su-10
 Sukhoi Su-11

Specifications (TR-1)

See also

References
Notes

Bibliography

External links
 Early Lyulka jet engines

TR-1
1940s turbojet engines